Raymundo Cámara Luján (May 14, 1850 – April 15, 1919) was a Mexican business magnate, investor, financier, landowner and a member of the influential Cámara family. He is considered one of the most prominent members of the Yucatecan oligarchy, known as the divine caste, that was formed during the boom economy that the region experienced at the end of the 19th century and the early 20th century.

His business interests ranged across various economics sectors, including the henequen industry, railways, banking, brewing and the exploitation of various raw materials such as chicle, sugarcane, tobacco, cocoa, cotton, banana, vanilla and various forest resources. He was also one of the founders of Banco Mercantil de Yucatán, S.A., the first bank in the Yucatán Peninsula.

When his father died, an event that happened when Cámara Luján was sixteen years old, he became head of the Cámara family, inheriting important estates, including Cancún. Starting in the 1880s, the henequen export boom to Europe and the United States was taken advantage of by large Yucatecan landowners who converted their haciendas to the production and marketing of henequen. However, after the financial panic of 1907, Cámara Luján, along with other traditional families of landowners, saw their economic interests threatened by the monopoly that Olegario Molina tried to form under the protection of the federal government headed by dictator Porfirio Díaz. Distanced from the Porfiriato, the great landowners of the Yucatecan peninsula became close to maderismo. His son-in-law, José María Pino Suárez, served as vice-president of Mexico, while two of his sons served as governors: Nicolás in Yucatán and Alfredo in Quintana Roo.

References 

1850 births
1919 deaths
Mexican businesspeople
Mexican financial businesspeople
People from Mérida, Yucatán